John Jacomb (3 October 1841 – 5 November 1891) was an Australian cricketer. He played one first-class cricket match for Victoria in 1860/61 and one match for Otago in 1863/64.

See also
 List of Victoria first-class cricketers
 List of Otago representative cricketers

References

1841 births
1891 deaths
Australian cricketers
Otago cricketers
Victoria cricketers
Cricketers from Hobart
Melbourne Cricket Club cricketers